In linear algebra, an invertible complex square matrix  is unitary if its conjugate transpose  is also its inverse, that is, if

where  is the identity matrix.

In physics, especially in quantum mechanics, the conjugate transpose is referred to as the Hermitian adjoint of a matrix and is denoted by a dagger (†), so the equation above is written

The real analogue of a unitary matrix is an orthogonal matrix. Unitary matrices have significant importance in quantum mechanics because they preserve norms, and thus, probability amplitudes.

Properties
For any unitary matrix  of finite size, the following hold:
  is normal.
  is diagonalizable; that is,  is unitarily similar to a diagonal matrix, as a consequence of the spectral theorem.
 .
 Its eigenspaces are orthogonal.

For any nonnegative integer , the set of all  unitary matrices with matrix multiplication forms a group, called the unitary group .

Any square matrix with unit Euclidean norm is the average of two unitary matrices.

Equivalent conditions
If U is a square, complex matrix, then the following conditions are equivalent:
  is unitary.
   is unitary.
In other words, . 
In other words, . 
  is an isometry with respect to the usual norm. That is,  for all , where .
  is a normal matrix (equivalently, there is an orthonormal basis formed by eigenvectors of ) with eigenvalues lying on the unit circle.

Elementary constructions

2 × 2 unitary matrix 
The general expression of a  unitary matrix is

The determinant of such a matrix is

The matrix  can also be written in this alternative form:

This expression highlights the relation between  unitary matrices and  orthogonal matrices of angle .

Another factorization is

Many other factorizations of a unitary matrix in basic matrices are possible.

See also
 Hermitian matrix and Skew-Hermitian matrix
 Matrix decomposition
 Orthogonal group O(n)
 Special orthogonal group SO(n)
 Orthogonal matrix
 Semi-orthogonal matrix
 Quantum logic gate
 Special Unitary group SU(n)
 Symplectic matrix
  Unitary group U(n)
 Unitary operator

References

External links 
 
 
 

Matrices
Unitary operators